Patrick Paul Elliot Embry (born 19 October 1942) is a former Australian politician. Born in Oundle in the United Kingdom to Air Chief Marshal Basil Embry and Lady Margaret Elliot, he arrived in Australia in December 1956 and became a farmer. In 2001, he was elected to the Western Australian Legislative Council for South West Region, representing One Nation. On 15 May 2003, he resigned from One Nation to sit as an independent. He co-founded the New Country Party with fellow ex-One Nation independent Frank Hough on 30 November 2004. Embry was defeated in 2005.

Embry ran for the Senate at the 2010 federal election as an independent grouped candidate.

References

1942 births
Living people
One Nation members of the Parliament of Western Australia
People from Oundle
English emigrants to Australia
Members of the Western Australian Legislative Council
21st-century Australian politicians